The brainchild of musicians Geoff Collinson and Michael Bertoncello, the Melbourne International Festival of Brass (MIFB) commenced in 2003.  It brings together Australian and international students, professionals, amateurs and brass educators. Geoff and Michael are able to attract professionals from around the globe and, with selected artists from Australia, establish the core of the MIFB.

The MIFB's Honorary Patron, Barry Tuckwell, is a French Horn player, conductor and educator and was a principal horn player in the London Symphony Orchestra for thirteen years.

External links

Music festivals in Melbourne
Music festivals established in 2003
Performing arts in Melbourne